Fischel is the Yiddish-derived form of the Hebrew name Ephraim. Notable people with the surname include:

Arnold Fischel (1830-1894), Dutch rabbi
Daniel Fischel (born 1950), American educator
Harry Fischel (1865-1948), American businessman
Henry A. Fischel (1913-2008), German-born American educator and writer
Robert Fischell (born 1929), American physicist

See also
Fischl
Fishel

Jewish surnames
Yiddish-language surnames